Jogesh Chandra Barman was an Indian politician. He was elected as MLA of Falakata Vidhan Sabha Constituency in West Bengal Legislative Assembly 1991, 1996, 2001 and 2006. He was the Forest and Backward Class Welfare Minister of West Bengal Government. He died on 10 February 2019 at the age of 69.

References

2019 deaths
Communist Party of India (Marxist) politicians
State cabinet ministers of West Bengal
West Bengal MLAs 1991–1996
West Bengal MLAs 1996–2001
West Bengal MLAs 2001–2006
West Bengal MLAs 2006–2011
Year of birth missing